Witold Stachurski (15 January 1947 – 16 May 2001) was a Polish boxer. He competed at the 1968 Summer Olympics and the 1972 Summer Olympics.

References

1947 births
2001 deaths
Polish male boxers
Olympic boxers of Poland
Boxers at the 1968 Summer Olympics
Boxers at the 1972 Summer Olympics
Sportspeople from Świętokrzyskie Voivodeship
People from Kielce County
Light-middleweight boxers